Kirchbrak is a municipality in the district of Holzminden, in Lower Saxony, Germany. 

The municipality lies only a few kilometers east of Bodenwerder. Through Kirchbrak flows a small river called Lenne,  a tributary of the Weser.  

It consists of five small villages and hamlets, named Kirchbrak, Westerbrak, Osterbrak, Breitenkamp and Heinrichshagen.

Kirchbrak is situated on the northern edge of the hilly area Vogler. 

Kirchbrak has two monumental buildings: 
 the Lutheran Saint Michael's Church, built in the 12th century, containing a remarkable 18th-century church organ and a 17th-century altarpiece; only open to visitors for attending Sunday services.
 the AMCO-Fabrikerweiterungsgebäude (AMCO factory enlargement building; built in 1925), an industrial monument designed by the famous architects Walter Gropius and Ernst Neufert; especially remarkable, because it is one of the earliest architectural creations in which Neufert took part.

Gallery

People 
 Andreas Rebers (born 1958), German cabaret artist, author and musician

References

Holzminden (district)